"Sorry 2004" is a song recorded by the American R&B singer Ruben Studdard. It was released as a single from his first album Soulful.

Chart performance
This song spent 20 weeks on the Billboard Hot 100 and peaked at number nine on February 28, 2004. It also charted on the R&B/Hip-Hop Songs chart, staying 28 weeks and peaking at number two on March 13, 2004.

Music video
The music video was directed by Bryan Barber and features Reagan Gomez-Preston as Studdard's love interest.

Charts

Weekly charts

Year-end charts

References

2003 singles
2003 songs
Ruben Studdard songs
J Records singles
Music videos directed by Bryan Barber
Songs written by Lil' Ronnie
Songs written by Harvey Mason Jr.
Songs written by Damon Thomas (record producer)
Songs written by Antonio Dixon (songwriter)
Songs written by Eric Dawkins